Arie Richard Hanitzsch (18 August 1927 – 3 August 1994) was a Brazilian diver. He competed in the men's 10 metre platform event and scored 59.40 points at the 1952 Summer Olympics.

References

External links
 

1927 births
1994 deaths
Brazilian male divers
Olympic divers of Brazil
Divers at the 1952 Summer Olympics
Divers from São Paulo
20th-century Brazilian people